The Cologne Central Mosque is a building  commissioned by German Muslims of the Organization DİTİB for a large, representative Zentralmoschee (central mosque) in Cologne, Germany. This mosque was inaugurated by  Turkish President Erdogan. After controversy, the project won the approval of Cologne's city council.

The mosque is designed in neo-Ottoman architectural style, with glass walls, two minarets and a dome. The mosque is proposed to have a bazaar as well as other secular areas intended for interfaith interactions. As the mosque will be one of Europe's biggest mosques, and the largest mosque in Germany, it has been criticized by some, particularly for the height of the minarets.

Design 
The  mosque cost £15–20 million to build, aiming to house 2,000 to 4,000 worshippers. The mosque is funded by Diyanet İşleri Türk İslam Birliği (DİTİB), a branch of the Turkish government's religious affairs authority, bank loans, and donations from 884 Muslim associations. Cologne's St. Theodore Catholic Church has also decided to fundraise for the mosque. The architects of the mosque are Gottfried Böhm and his son Paul Böhm, who specializes in building churches.

The mosque is in the Ottoman architecture style. It has a main hall of 36.5 meter, and two 55 meter high minarets. The mosque has the bazaar and entrance on the ground floor, lecture halls in the basement, the prayer area on the upper floor and include a Muslim library. A well is placed in the centre to connect the two levels and create a pleasant atmosphere. The mosque consists of flat-like wall screens which form a dome in the centre.

It also has glass walls, which according to DİTİB spokesman Alboga give visitors a feeling of openness. According to the architect, openness is further enhanced by an inviting staircase from the street. The developers have required that the secular areas of the mosque (e.g. the restaurant, event halls and stores) be open to people of all religions. A plan welcomed by then mayor of Cologne Fritz Schramma to build shorter minarets was dropped after the architects said the plan would leave the minarets out of proportion with the rest of the building and surrounding structures.

Opening 
It was first used as a mosque in 2017. The inauguration of the mosque in September 2018 during the state visit to Germany by the Turkish President Recep Tayyip Erdoğan was controversial as the Turkish-Islamic Union for Religious Affairs neglected to provide a satisfying security concept for the event. Therefore Cologne only premitted a limited number of attendees of 500 invited guests to the inauguration. DİTİB also failed to allow the mayor of Cologne Henriette Reker to hold a speech at the inauguration, following which she declined to attend. Reker lamented the fact that the official inauguration took part in presence of Erdogan as the mosque was in use since quite some while also before. It was interpreted that DİTİB was more an extension to the Turkish Government and the it was not interested in a cooperation with german institutions. Armin Laschet, the Minister President of North Rhine Westphalia also declined to attend.

Controversy 
The project has been opposed by author Ralph Giordano, right-wingers, then local district's deputy mayor, has criticized the project saying that "We don't want to build a Turkish ghetto in Ehrenfeld. I know about Londonistan and I don't want that here."

Markus Wiener of the far-right activist group Pro Cologne, expressed his fear that the Cologne mosque will empower the Muslim population too much.

On June 16, 2007, 200 people gathered in a protest organized by Pro Cologne against the mosque including representatives from the Austrian Freedom Party and the Belgian Vlaams Belang. Then district deputy mayor Uckermann seconded that he thinks many residents reject the mosque because they believe that Cologne is a “Christian city”. Author Ralph Giordano stated that he opposed the project as the mosque would be “an expression of the creeping Islamization of our land”, a “declaration of war”, and that he wouldn't want to see women wearing headscarfs on German streets, likening their appearance to “human penguins”. Henryk M. Broder, a journalist, disagrees with Giordano's metaphor but said that “A mosque is more than a church or a synagogue. It is a political statement.” Giordano's remarks have turned the local dispute into a national debate about the place of Islam in Germany. and other prominent Germans criticized the project as well. District mayor Uckermann stated that Giordano's comments “broke down the wall. Before if you criticised this monstrous mosque you were a Nazi. But we have a problem with the integration of Muslims. It's a question of language and culture.” Uckermann left the conservative CDU for right-wing Pro Cologne in 2008 after being voted out of office as the district's deputy mayor and reportedly facing party exclusion.

The city's official for integration Marlis Bredehorst stated that "it is important that the Muslims here get dignified houses of prayer" and added that "two hundred years ago, the Protestants had to pray secretively in Catholic Cologne [...] that is something we can't imagine anymore today." The city's mayor, Fritz Schramma, who supports the project said that “For me, it is self-evident that the Muslims need to have a prestigious place of worship, but it bothers me when people have lived here for 35 years and they don’t speak a single word of German.” Christian leaders have taken similarly ambivalent stances: the Catholic Church has long supported the project, though recently Cardinal Joachim Meisner, Archbishop of Cologne, has been more cautious: when asked if he was afraid of the mosque, he said, “I don't want to say I'm afraid, but I have an uneasy feeling.” He also stated that Turkey should allow its Christian minorities equivalent rights. He said the mosque would change the skyline of Cologne. Wolfgang Huber, Germany's top Protestant bishop, criticized the “male domination” he saw in Islam and said Muslims should be able to convert to Christianity without fearing reprisals and the penalty of death.

Public opinion seems “guardedly supportive, with a majority of residents saying they favor it”. A poll taken by a local newspaper among 500 Cologne residents showed that the project is supported by 63%, of whom 27% want its size to be reduced.

A protest planned by Pro Cologne for September 20, 2008 was canceled by police at the last minute in the interest of public safety, after clashes between police and protestors.

On August 28, 2008, the Cologne City Council voted to approve the construction of the mosque. This position was taken by all parties except the Christian democrats (CDU), except for Fritz Schramma, the CDU mayor, who approved the construction. Outside the hall, a group of 30 protesters demonstrated against the approval, while 100 demonstrated in favor of it.

The Cologne mosque project has been contrasted with a less controversial project in Duisburg, Germany: in Duisburg, there was co-operation and good communication from an early stage between German politicians, church and community leaders and the developers of the mosque.

See also 

 Controversies related to Islam and Muslims
 List of mosques in Germany

References

External links 

 
 
 
 Çalışkan, Burcu: Die Akte des medialen Islam – Moscheenboom in Deutschland. Ein Aufstieg des Homo Islamicus? Oder: Die Einbürgerung des Islams. Eine diskursanalytische und kommunikationswissenschaftliche Untersuchung des Moscheenstreits in Köln-Ehrenfeld. 2010.

2017 establishments in Germany
Ehrenfeld, Cologne
Mosques completed in 2017
Mosques in Germany
Mosque-related controversies in Europe
Religion and politics
Religious buildings and structures in Cologne
DITIB mosque